Nathan Fellows Dixon (December 13, 1774January 29, 1842) was a United States senator from Rhode Island. Born in Plainfield, Connecticut, he attended Plainfield Academy and graduated from the College of Rhode Island and Providence Plantations (the former name of Brown University) at Providence in 1799. He studied law, was admitted to the bar in 1801 and commenced practice in New London County, Connecticut. He moved to Westerly, Rhode Island, in 1802 and continued the practice of law, and also engaged in banking, serving as president of the Washington bank of Westerly from 1829 until his death.

Dixon was a member of the Rhode Island House of Representatives from 1813 and 1830, and served as a colonel in the state militia. He was elected as a Whig to the U.S. Senate and served from March 4, 1839, until his death in Washington, D.C., in 1842. While in the Senate, he was chairman of the Committee on Revolutionary Claims (Twenty-seventh Congress). Interment in River Bend Cemetery, Westerly, Rhode Island.

Dixon's son Nathan Fellows Dixon was a U.S. Representative and his grandson Nathan Fellows Dixon III was a U.S. Representative and Senator, all from Rhode Island.

See also

List of United States Congress members who died in office (1790–1899)

References

External links 
 

1774 births
1842 deaths
People from Plainfield, Connecticut
Dixon family
Rhode Island Whigs
19th-century American politicians
Whig Party United States senators
United States senators from Rhode Island
Members of the Rhode Island House of Representatives
American bankers
Brown University alumni